is a Japanese boxer. He competed in the men's bantamweight event at the 2016 Summer Olympics.

References

External links
 

1996 births
Living people
Japanese male boxers
Olympic boxers of Japan
Boxers at the 2016 Summer Olympics
People from Osaka
Sportspeople from Osaka
Boxers at the 2018 Asian Games
Asian Games competitors for Japan
Bantamweight boxers
21st-century Japanese people